Raymond Groarke (born 1952) is an Irish judge who was a judge of the Circuit Court between 1996 and 2022. He was the President of the Circuit Court from June 2012 to July 2019. He was previously a barrister.

Early life 
Groarke was born in 1952. He was educated at Clongowes Wood College, University College Dublin and the King's Inns. He was called to the Bar in 1973. He practiced as a barrister, predominantly on the Midlands circuit.

Judicial career

Circuit Court 
In 1996, he was appointed a judge of the Circuit Court. He was assigned to the Eastern Circuit between 1998 and 2005, before moving to the Western Circuit.

Following the end of his term as president, he returned to sit as an ordinary Circuit Court judge in County Galway and County Mayo for the Western Circuit.

President of the Circuit Court 
He was appointed President of the Circuit Court in 2012. As President of the Circuit Court and through the remainder of his term as an ordinary judge, he was an  member of the High Court.

His term concluded in July 2019. He was succeeded by Patricia Ryan.

Retirement 
His final day as a judge was 10 January 2022.

Personal life 
Groarke is married to Joan.

References

1952 births
Living people
20th-century Irish lawyers
Alumni of University College Dublin
People educated at Clongowes Wood College
Circuit Court (Ireland) judges
Alumni of King's Inns
Presidents of the Circuit Court (Ireland)